George James Minty Jr. (September 16, 1929, Detroit – August 6, 1986, Bloomington, Indiana) was an American mathematician, specializing in mathematical analysis and discrete mathematics. He is known for the Klee–Minty cube and the Browder–Minty theorem.

Biography

George Minty Jr. grew up in Detroit. His father emigrated, after WW I, from Scotland to work in Detroit's automotive industry as a tool and die maker. George Minty Jr. received his bachelor's degree from Detroit's Wayne State University.  After service in the US Army Signal Corps at Fort Monmouth, he became in 1956 a graduate student in mathematics at the University of Michigan. There he received in 1959 his PhD with thesis Integrability Conditions for Vector Fields in Banach Spaces supervised by Erich Rothe. As a postdoc in 1959 he was briefly a visiting researcher at Tokyo's Waseda University.

Minty joined the University of Michigan faculty and was eventually promoted to associate professor before he resigned in 1965. For the academic year 1964–1965 he was on leave to do research at the Courant Institute. In 1965 he was awarded a Sloan Research Fellowship. At Indiana University he was a full professor of mathematics from 1965 until his death in 1986.

Research
Minty's 1966 paper On the axiomatic foundations of the theories of directed linear graphs, electrical networks and network-programming is important in matroid theory. In that 1966 paper, according to Dominic Welsh:

According to K.-C. Chang:

In 2012 D. Erdős, A. Frank, and K. Kun published a sharpening of Minty's coloring theorem (published in 1962 in The American Mathematical Monthly).

Selected publications
 
 
 
 
 
 
 
 
 
 
 
 
 Abstract of ''How good is the simplex method?"'

References

20th-century American mathematicians
Wayne State University alumni
University of Michigan alumni
University of Michigan faculty
Indiana University faculty
Sloan Research Fellows
1929 births
1986 deaths